HMS Ulster was a modified Admiralty  destroyer that served in the Royal Navy during the First World War. The Modified R class added attributes of the Yarrow Later M class to improve the capability of the ships to operate in bad weather. Launched on 10 October 1917, the vessel served with the Grand Fleet. After the war, the destroyer was placed initially in the Home Fleet, but then moved to the Reserve Fleet before, on 21 April 1928, being sold to be broken up.

Design and development

Ulster was one of eleven Modified  destroyers ordered by the British Admiralty in March 1916 as part of the Eighth War Construction Programme. The design was a development of the existing R class, adding features from the Yarrow Later M class which had been introduced based on wartime experience. The forward two boilers were transposed and vented through a single funnel, enabling the bridge and forward gun to be placed further aft. Combined with hull-strengthening, this improved the destroyers' ability to operate at high speed in bad weather.

Two funnels were fitted.

Armament consisted of three single  Mk V QF guns on the ship's centreline, with one on the forecastle, one aft on a raised platform and one between the funnels. A single 2-pounder  "pom-pom anti-aircraft gun was carried on a platform between two twin mounts for  torpedoes. The ship had a complement of 82 officers and ratings.

Construction and careers
Laid down by William Beardmore and Company in Dalmuir with the yard number 560, Ulster was launched on 10 October 1917 and completed on 21 November. The vessel was the first of the name, named after Ulster, one of the traditional provinces of Ireland.

On commissioning, Ulster joined the Thirteenth Destroyer Flotilla of the Grand Fleet, and served there until 1919. The flotilla took part in the Royal Navy's sortie to intercept one of the final sorties of the German High Seas Fleet during the First World War, on 24 April 1918, although the two fleets did not actually meet and the destroyer did not engage the enemy.

On 5 July that year, the destroyer left Chatham to take part in exercises for the Reserve Fleet. These happened annually. In 1923, the Navy decided to retire many of the older destroyers in preparation for the introduction of newer and larger vessels. The ship was one of those chosen to be removed from the service and was sold to Thos. W. Ward of Pembroke Dock on 21 April 1928 and broken up.

Pennant numbers

References

Citations

Bibliography

 
 
 
 
 
 
 
 
 

 

1917 ships
Ships built on the River Clyde
R-class destroyers (1916)
World War I destroyers of the United Kingdom